HAD CCD is the name of a technology Sony implemented on some of their CCD image sensors.

List of HAD CCD sensors

See also
Sony BIONZ
Sony Exmor
Nikon EXPEED

References

Sony image sensors